Garry Kasparov and Vladimir Kramnik have played 49 classical chess games, of which Kramnik won five, Kasparov won four, with the remaining 40 games drawn. Thus the overall score favors Kramnik (+5−4=40). If blitz and rapid games are included (where time controls are much shorter than in classical games) the overall score favors Kasparov (+22−21=79). The first decisive classical game between the two players was at Linares in 1994, which Kramnik won at the age of just 18.

Kasparov achieved two wins before the title match against Kramnik's Sicilian Defence. Kramnik had success against Kasparov's King's Indian Defence. In the title match Kramnik dropped the Sicilian and successfully employed the Berlin defence of the Ruy Lopez. The score was 5–3 in favor for Kramnik after the match, but Kasparov narrowed the gap to 5–4 in Astana 2001.

All the decisive games were won by white except for a win by Kramnik in 1996. After the tournament in Astana the players met only in the Botvinnik Memorial match and in Linares 2003 and 2004. Kasparov retired from professional chess in 2005.

References

Games between Kasparov and Kramnik
Chess rivalries
Garry Kasparov